Zonocerus is a genus of grasshoppers (Caelifera) in the family Pyrgomorphidae and the tribe Phymateini. The two species are found in Africa, with Z. elegans found more in central and southern regions, including Madagascar. Both species are significant agricultural pests, especially for African smallholder farmers.

Species
The Orthoptera Species File and Catalogue of Life list the following:
Zonocerus elegans (Thunberg, 1815) – type species (as "Gryllus elegans" Thunberg)
Zonocerus variegatus (Linnaeus, 1758)

Gallery

References

External links

Pyrgomorphidae
Caelifera genera
Taxa named by Carl Stål